The Chesapeake Bay Gateways Network is a partnership program of the National Park Service and a system of over 150 parks, refuges, museums, historic communities and water trails in the Chesapeake Bay watershed. As a partnership program, it is not considered a Unit of the National Park System, but is managed by the National Park Service's Chesapeake Bay Office in Annapolis, Maryland, which also manages the Captain John Smith Chesapeake National Historic Trail and the Star-Spangled Banner National Historic Trail.

Sites in the greater Chesapeake Bay watershed are eligible to participate in the Network, including sites in the Potomac River basin out to West Virginia and sites in the Susquehanna River basin out to New York State.

History
The Chesapeake Bay Gateways Network was established through the authority of the Chesapeake Bay Initiative Act, which was passed by the United States Congress in 1998 in order "to establish a linked network of locations, such as parks, historic seaports, or museums—known as gateways—where the public can access and experience the bay," according to a 2006 report by the United States Government Accountability Office (GAO). This initiative has been supported through grants provided by the U.S. National Park Service (Park Service). GAO personnel undertook preparation of that report in 2005 in response to concerns expressed by members of the U.S. Congress regarding the National Park Service's management of the gateways network.

References

External links
 Chesapeake Bay Office. National Park Service website.
 Bay Info. Chesapeake Bay Gateways Network.
 Maryland Parks and Recreation Areas with State Park. parksandcampgrounds.com.

National Park Service areas in Maryland
National Park Service areas in Virginia
Protected areas of Maryland
Protected areas of Virginia